Nicholas Campbell Farr-Jones AM (born 18 April 1962) is a former Australian rugby union footballer. His position was scrum-half. He is probably best remembered for winning the 1991 Rugby World Cup with his team against England. He now works at Taurus Funds Management, appears as a TV rugby commentator on UK Sky Sports and is the chairman of the New South Wales Rugby Union.

Early life
He attended Newington College (1974–1979) and St Andrew's College within the University of Sydney. Not selected for the First XV at Newington, Farr-Jones played his early first grade rugby for Sydney University and worked as a lawyer when rugby was an amateur sport.

Rugby
Selected for the 1984 tour of Europe, he made his international début for the Wallabies on 3 November 1984 v England at Twickenham, which Australia won 19-3 and quickly established himself as a regular in the test side from then on, scoring his first try in the final test against Scotland. After playing in the 1986 Bledisloe Cup series win against the All Blacks, he played in the inaugural Rugby World Cup in 1987 and a year later was named Australian captain, at the age of 25. By this stage he was known as one part of Australia's "holy trinity" (the other two being David Campese and Michael Lynagh). Indeed, of Campese's then world record 64 international tries, Farr-Jones had a hand in 46 of them. His captaincy started well enough with a two test home series win against England but Australia were well beaten in the 1988 Bledisloe and in 1989 lost the series to the British Lions. His temperament under pressure was questioned, though he was the subject of particularly nasty and provocative foul by opposite number Robert Jones, who in an effort to unsettle him, stamped a studded boot onto the top of Farr-Jones' right foot, which had recently been injured. More pressure followed in 1990 after the Wallabies were down 2–0 in the Bledisloe series it seemed certain he would lose the captaincy but the side won the final test 21–9 in Wellington and he celebrated with a naked swim in Wellington Harbour. The 1991 Bledisloe series was closely fought, ending in a tie and the Wallabies arrived in the British Isles in good form for the World Cup. He carried a knee injury into the tournament and was rested for the pool game against Samoa and substituted in the quarter-final midway through the second-half with what looked like a serious injury. After that nail biting finish he was back for the semi-final against New Zealand and the final, won by Australia, of which he said "We had to tackle till our shoulders were red raw just to keep them out". He was also instrumental in 1992 for the Wallabies, with wins over the All Blacks in the Bledisloe Cup and the Springboks in Cape Town, a win that ended doubts over the Wallabies claim to be the best team in the world. He briefly retired from the sport at this stage but was persuaded back for the final two homes tests against South Africa in 1993, after Australia lost the opening match in the series.

Farr-Jones was capped 63 times for Australia, including 36 as captain (then a world record), and scored nine tries. During his career, he formed a world record half-back combination with Michael Lynagh of 47 tests together.

Personal life
Farr-Jones is a self-described "praying" Christian and speaks publicly about his faith. He is married with four children. The Liberal Party of Australia considered asking Farr-Jones to stand as their candidate in a potential byelection in the marginal parliamentary Division of Wentworth.

Honours
 1992 Australia Day Honours: Member of the Order of Australia (AM) in recognition of service to the sport of Rugby Union football. 
 2001: Centenary Medal for service to Australian society through the sport of Rugby Union

Awards
 1999: Inducted into the International Rugby Hall of Fame
 2008: Inducted into the Australian Rugby Union Hall of Fame
 2011: Inducted into the IRB Hall of Fame alongside all other Rugby World Cup-winning captains and head coaches from the tournament's inception in 1987 through 2007 (minus the previously inducted John Eales)

References

External links
1991 World Cup on BBC Sport
Sporting Heroes page 1
Sporting Heroes page 2
Sporting Heroes page 3
Sporting Heroes page 4

Australian rugby union players
Australia international rugby union players
Australian rugby union captains
Rugby union scrum-halves
World Rugby Hall of Fame inductees
Sport Australia Hall of Fame inductees
People educated at Newington College
Members of the Order of Australia
Living people
1962 births
Barbarian F.C. players
Rugby union players from Sydney